The 12382 / 12381 Poorva Express are daily superfast express trains of Indian Railways running between Howrah, West Bengal, and New Delhi, the capital city of India. The name Poorva signifies the eastern part of India, and the train attracts travellers from Bihar, Jharkhand & West Bengal.

History
Prior to the introduction of the Rajdhani Express, the Deluxe Express was the premium category superfast trains of India. Fully air conditioned and superfast, they were given the highest priority in Indian Railways. There were two of them. One use to imply between Amritsar and Bandra, and another from Amritsar to Howrah. Both of them use to carry the ICF Rajdhani liveried coaches. Later with due course of time the Deluxe Express till Bandra was renamed as Paschim Express while the Deluxe Express till Howrah was renamed as Poorva Express. The Poorva Express was launched on the 2nd of October, 1956 and ran as the first fully air conditioned train of India.

With due course of time, the "fully Air Conditioned" was stripped off from its name to accommodate additional Non-AC sleeper Coaches and was subsequently terminated till New Delhi. And with the launch of trains like Udyan Abha Toofan Express and Howrah Rajdhani Express, it lost its grandeur and subsequently its priority. It was relegated to Maroon-cream coloured Coaches with no tubelights only bulbs inside the coach first and then to Standard Blue ICF Coaches with tubelights inside the coach. But later before getting refurbished to LHB coach in April 2013, being the first superfast category train to receive them.

Though it suffered with time, but its popularity never ceased. Due to its huge demand, Indian Railways introduced a second pair of Poorva Express on 1 August 1971 via Patna. Not only that, during its peak time it was one of the longest train with a load of 24 coaches and was used to be hauled by twin WDM-2 engines between Mughalsarai and Chittaranjan.

Coach composition
The train has standard LHB rakes/ICF rakes with a max speed of 130 km/h. The train consists of 22 coaches:
 1HA (1st AC cum 2A)
 2 AC II Tier
 5 AC III Tier
 9 Sleeper Coaches
 1 Pantry Car
 2 General Unreserved
 2 HOG

Gallery

Route & Halts
 Howrah Junction
 Bardhaman junction
 Durgapur
 Asansol Junction
 chitranjan
 Madhupur
 Jasidih
 Jhajha
 Jamui
 Kiul
 Patna Junction
 Danapur
 Ara Junction
 Pt. Deen Dayal Upadhayaya Junction
 Prayagraj Junction
 Kanpur Central
 Etawah
 Tundla
 Aligarh Junction railway station
 New Delhi

Traction
It is regularly hauled by a Howrah Loco Shed based WAP 7 (HOG) equipped locomotive on its entire journey.

Rake Sharing
The train shares its rake with 12381/12382 Poorva Express (via Gaya).

Train detail

Accidents and incidents
On 14 December 2014 the 12381 UP Howrah - New Delhi Poorva Express derailed at 8.27 am after leaving Howrah at 8.15 am.  11 sleeper coaches and a pantry car (AC Hot Buffet Car) of the New Delhi-bound Poorva Express derailed at Liluah shortly after leaving Howrah station. There were no casualties or injuries to any passengers, railway officials said. The train was moving at a slow speed when it derailed, the officials said, adding that the reasons for the mishap were being examined. What saved the passengers was the speed of the train. "The Poorva Express was moving at 10 to 15 km/h when the accident occurred. The average speed of the train is 63 km/h, though it can travel at 120 km/h. Derailment at higher speeds would have been catastrophic," an official said.

References

External links
Poorva Express/12303
Poorva Express/12304
Poorva Express

Rail transport in Jharkhand
Rail transport in Bihar
Delhi–Kolkata trains
Railway services introduced in 1950
Express trains in India
Named passenger trains of India
Rail transport in Uttar Pradesh
Rail transport in Delhi
Rail transport in West Bengal]